Jacobsen Glacier is a glacier flowing east-northeast from Mount Reid, in the Holland Range, Antarctica, into the Ross Ice Shelf. It was mapped by the United States Geological Survey from Tellurometer surveys (1961–62) and Navy air photos (1960), and was named by the Advisory Committee on Antarctic Names for H. Jacobsen, Master of the  during U.S. Navy Operation Deep Freeze 1964 and 1965.

References

Glaciers of the Ross Dependency
Shackleton Coast